Aya Tarek is an Egyptian artist from the city of Alexandria. Tarek's mediums are primarily street art or graffiti and paint.  Although street art in Egypt gained much international attention after the 2011 revolution, Tarek began sharing her street art on the walls of Alexandria in 2008, when she was 18. Tarek also produces indoor murals which she feels helps her in to be taken more seriously as an artist. However, she utterly stresses the importance of street art because it is accessible to anyone to take whatever they may need to from the work.

Life
She was born in 1989, her grandfather was a craftsman. In 2008, she began graffiti.

Career

Tarek is seen by many as the first androgynous street artist in Egypt.

She was in a film by Ahmed Abdallah called Microphone, which explores Alexandria’s art scene leading up to the 2011 revolution  In one of her own pieces, "How to Fuck Your Mind", Tarek portrays a graffiti artist’s instant rise and fall from fame. The animated film includes Tarek’s personal experiences with the media and how have affected her.  An outspoken critic, Tarek uses multiple art venues that center on graffiti to express her views and share them with others in public spaces. She explains her philosophy, asserting that graffiti "is not about being rich, or having a secluded space." Tarek has a strong following on Facebook and several Egyptian-based blogs.

In the fall of 2012, Tarek participated in an exhibition in Beirut called White Wall, which brought together graffiti artists from all over the world. The exhibit was organized by the Beirut Art Center in partnership with Foundation Saradar and featured an exhibit at the Beirut Art Center and works displayed on the streets of Beirut. Aya Tarek describes her experience here to be extremely free and the other artists were not expected to stick to one message when creating this wall. Many different artists from all around the world came here to work in a space free of judgement.

Although Tarek's work is seen as a part of a political agenda, she states that, "most of us are not really political; [us] artists … are not about politics, nor is our art. We’re about style and technique. It’s not about heavy political subject matter" She states that after the revolution, the West's view of Egypt changed drastically, which is why many artists portrayed political ideals in their work. 

Aya Tarek stresses the importance of street art, especially in Egypt. She talks on how it is extremely available to the public to see, despite the vast censorship that occurs in her country. She states, “The street is for everyone.” She considers herself to be an experimental artists, and practices vast creative freedom in her work.

See also
Contemporary Art in Egypt

References

Living people
Year of birth missing (living people)
Egyptian graffiti artists
People from Alexandria
Women graffiti artists
Egyptian contemporary artists
Women muralists
21st-century Egyptian painters
21st-century Egyptian women artists